Ravesht-e Bozorg (also Romanized as Ravesht-e Bozorg; also known as Rosht-e-Bozorg) is a village in Benajuy-ye Shomali Rural District, in the Central District of Bonab County, East Azerbaijan Province, Iran. At the 2006 census, its population was 2,616, in 642 families.

References 

Populated places in Bonab County